Sindelbach may refer to:

Sindelbach (Jagst), a river of Baden-Württemberg, Germany, tributary of the Jagst
Sindelbach (Körsch), a river of Baden-Württemberg, Germany, headstream of the Körsch